Princess Maria Anna Victoria of Savoy ((); 11 September 1683 – 11 October 1763) was the daughter of Prince Louis Thomas of Savoy, Count of Soissons, and Uranie de La Cropte de Beauvais (1655-1717).

Biography
As the daughter of Louis Thomas, Count of Soissons, she was styled Mademoiselle de Soissons or Mademoiselle de Carignan prior to her marriage. Her father had married at the age of twenty two far below his class and in secret Uranie de La Cropte de Beauvais, after the death of her husband Uranie retired into a monastery. Maria Anna Victoria was the niece of Prince Eugene of Savoy, the great general and statesman of imperial Austria, a patron of the arts whom she had never met. 

Upon Prince Eugene's sudden death in 1736, without a will or testament, Maria Anna Victoria as his closest relative inherited his immense possessions in Austria, which she then proceeded to quickly sell off at cut rate prices. His mansions, vast art collections (with an estimated 400 pictures), antique furniture, old masters, statues, even his wartime medals, the sword given to him by Anne, Queen of Great Britain, for his part in the War of the Spanish Succession and the portrait given to him by Emperor Joseph were sold; nothing was spared.  Only his library and his favourite palace, the Belvedere were purchased by the Emperor, while Schloss Hof and the Stadtpalais went to Maria Theresa.

The bitterness of every Austrian against Maria Anna Victoria as she proceeded with the liquidation was expressed in a couplet which was pinned on her door:

Embellished with her fantastic dowry, fifty-two-year-old Princess Maria Anna Victoria married on 17 April 1738 German officer and Feldzeugmeister of the Imperial Army Prince Joseph of Saxe-Hildburghausen, who was sixteen years younger than her, and led a life of lavish parties. The union ended in divorce in 1757 after Saxe-Hildburghausen was said to have ingloriously ran away. The couple had no children.

She then lived for a time in France, and eventually died in Turin, Italy, in 1763 at the age of 76.

Ancestry

References

Sources
 
 
 
 
 
 

1683 births
1763 deaths
Nobility from Paris
Princesses of Savoy
House of Saxe-Hildburghausen
Burials at the Basilica of Superga
Princesses of Saxe-Hildburghausen
Place of birth missing